Eva was a Norwegian monthly magazine, released by Allers Familie-Journal in 2004. Its target group was "active women 40 years and older", and its circulation was 42,943 in 2004. The editor was Kirsten Offerdal who also served as the editor of Henne.

It was discontinued in early 2009.

References

2004 establishments in Norway
2009 disestablishments in Norway
Defunct magazines published in Norway
Magazines established in 2004
Magazines disestablished in 2009
Norwegian-language magazines
Monthly magazines published in Norway
Women's magazines published in Norway